The 1966 South African Gazelles tour in Argentina was a series of rugby union matches played in Argentina and in Chile in 1966.

It was the third tour of a South African representative team to Argentina, after the two Junior Springboks tours in 1932 and 1959.

The "Gazelles" were a team of developing players in the Under-23 age group, selected by the South African Rugby Union.

Results 

Unión Cordobesa: F. Mezquida; L. Rodríguez, J. Mancini, E. Quetglas, E. Mulle; M. Olmedo Arana, J.
Del Valle; P. Demo, J. Masjoan, R. Carballo; J. Imaz (capt.), E. Corne¬lla; G. Ribetea, C. Félix, J.
Coceo. 
Gazelles: A. Pretorius; P. Court, S. Nomis, J. Bennet, B. Meiring; J. Barnard, D. de Villiers (capt);
C. Du Pisanie, J. Wilkens, J. Ellis; E. Carelse, J. Swart; B. Alberts, G. Pitzer, G. Kotze

Rosario: J. Seaton; E. España, J. Benzi, A. Dogliani, J. Galán; J. Caballero, C. Cristi; J. Imhoff, J.
Costante, M. Chesta; H. Ferraro, M. Bouza; R. Esmendi, R. Seaton, J. Gómez Kenny.
Gazelles: R. Gould; P. Court, I. Bond, S. Nomis, B. Meiring; P. Visagie, P. Uys; J. Ellis, A. De Waal, J.Marais; E. Claasen, G. Carelse; B. Alberts, B. Harrison, G. Kotze.

Tucumán: C. Ponce; N. Antoni, R. Ternavafio, J. Villafañe, G Casanova; E. Burgos, J. Frías Silva; J.C. Ghiringelli, J. Ghiringelli, J. Paz; H. Roldán, J. Lomáscolo; F. Poujada, R. Roldán, N. Du Plessis.
 Gazelles: A. Pretorius; P. Court, J. Bennet, S. Nomis, R. Gould; P. Visagie, P. Uys; J. Ellis, A. De
Waal, J. Wilkens; G. Carelse, J. Swart; J. Marais, G. Pitzer, G. Kotze.

Seleccionado del Interior: J. Seaton; G. Beverino, E. Quetglas, J. Benzi, L. Rodríguez; J. Caballero, C. Cristi; J. Imhoff, M. Chesta, J. Paz; M. Bouza, E. Cornella; J. Ghiringhelli, R. Seaton, G. Ríbecca. Gazelles: R. Gould; B. Meiring, J. Bennet, S. Nomis, P. Court; I. Bond, D. De Villiers; C. Du Pisanie,A. De Waal, J. Wilkens; G. Carelse, J. Swart; B. Alberts, G. Pitzer, J. Marais.

Mar del Plata: C. Marenco; A. Verde, A. Omaña, E. Corbacho, G. Beverino; L. Prieto, E. Rodríguez; H. Cabarcos, N. Cerviño, C. Etchegaray; J. Rodríguez Jurado, R. Losada; J. García, R. Mandojana,R. Sepe.
 Gazelles: A. Pretorius; R. Gould, J. Bennet, I. Bond, Meiring A.; B. Visagie, D. De Villiers; C. Du Pisanie, J. Wilkens, J. Ellis; G. Carelse, J. Swart; B. Alberts, B. Harrison, G. Kotze.

Seleccionado de 2ª División: O. Alonso; J. Fiordalisi, A. Pagano, G. Black, A. Ceccone; E. Poggi, C.Cullen; A. Da Milano, J. Cornejo, J. Marenco; A. Lowenthal, 0. Beltrame, E. Benito, C. Massabón, A.
Marenco.
 Gazelles: A. Pretorius; P. Court, I. Bond, J. Bennet, B. Meiring; P. Visagie, P. Uys; D. Du Pisanie, A.De Waal, J. Ellis; J. Swart, E. Claasen; J. Marais, G. Pitzer, B. Alberts.

C. A. San Isidro: J. Lasalle; E. Neri, M. Molina, A. Travaglini, M. Queirolo; M. Beccar Varela, A.
Etchegaray; C. Calónico, J. O'Reilly, M. Puigdeval; G. Scallan, A. Pasman; C. Montes de Oca, N.González del Solar, A. Monticelli. Gazelles: R. Gould; P. Court, S. Nomis, J. Bennet, B. Meiring; I. Bond, P. Uys; J. Ellis, A. De Waal,
J. Wilkens; E. Claasen, G. Carelse; J. Marais, B. Harrison, G. Kotze.

Argentina B D. Morgan; C. Cornille, L. Esteras, A. Pagano, A. Quetglas; E. Poggi, A.
Etchegaray; G. Plesky, A. Dunn, J. Imhoff; A. Anthony, H. De Martini; W. Aniz, N. González del Solar,
J. Ghiringelli.
 Gazelles: A. Pretorius; B. Meiring, S. Nomis, J. Bennet, P. Court; J. Barnard, P. Uys; C. Du Piesanie, A. De Waal, J. Ellis; G. Carelse, J. Swart; J. Marais, G. Pitzer, B. Alberts.

Belgrano A. C..: R. Tanner; C. Cornille, L. Esteras, A. Gómez Aparicio, E. De las Carreras; C.
Martínez, L. Gradín; R. Loyola, E. Elowson, H. Valenzuela; M. Cole, C. Iribarren; E. Verardo, F. Gradín, G. Mc Cormick.
 Gazelles: A. Pretorius; R. Gould, S. Nomis, I. Bond, B. Meiring; J. Barnard, D. De Villiers; J. Ellis, J. Wilkens, C. Du Piesanie; E. Clasen, G. Carelse; B. Alberts, B. Harrison, G. Kotze.

Argentina: M. Dumas; E. Neri, A. Rodríguez Jurado, M. Pascual, H. Goti; R. Cazenave, L. Gradín; M. Chesta, M. Bouza, R. Loyola; B. Otaño, L. García Yañez; G. Mc Cormick, R. Handley, R. Foster.
 Gazelles: A. Pretorius; R. Gould, J. Bennet, I. Bond, B. Meiring; J. Barnard, P. Uys; C. Du Piesanie, A. De Waal, J. Ellis; G. Carelse, J. Swart; B. Alberts, G. Pitzer, J. Marais.

C.U.B.A.:  M. Dumas; H. Goti, A. Álvarez, M. Lawson, J. Freixas; L. Zorraquín, G. Blacksley; C. Fontán, H. Miguens, J. Esteves; F. Álvarez, R. Cazabal; A. Dumas, J. Dumas, E. Gaviña.  Gazelles: A. Pretorius; B. Meiring, J. Bennet, I. Bond, P. Court; P. Visagie, D. De Villiers; C. Du Piesanie, J. Wilkens, J. Marais; G. Carelse, J. Swart; B. Alberts, B. Harrison, G. Kotze.

Argentina: M. Dumas; E. Neri, A. Rodríguez Jurado, M. Pascual, R. Cazenave; E. Poggi, L. Gradín; R. Loyola, M. Bouza, M. Chesta; B. Otaño, L. García Yañez; G. Me Cormick, R. Handley; R. Foster.  Gazelles: A. Pretorius; P. Court, I. Bond, J. Bennet, B. Meiring; J. Barnard, P. Uys; C. Du Piesanie, J. Wilkens, J. Marais; J. Swart, G. Carelse; G. Kotze, G. Pitzer, B. Alberts.

Touring party

Player statistics 

Note: Totals do not include the match against Chile.

Notes

External links 
 Union Argentina de Rugby – Memorias 1966

South Africa
rugby
Rugby union tours of Argentina
Junior Springboks
South Africa national rugby union team tours